Paraliparis bipolaris is a species of fish in the family Liparidae (snailfish).

Description

Its specific name means "of the two poles", an allusion to how it is closely related to Paraliparis kreffti, an Antarctic fish.

Habitat

Paraliparis bipolaris lives in the northeast Atlantic Ocean, off Ireland's southwest coast.

References

Liparidae
Fish described in 1997
Taxa named by Anatoly Andriyashev